Pandogari is a town (ward) in Kagara, the capital of Rafi local government in Niger State, Nigeria. There is a large Hill which called Kongoma hill, in Fulfulde (Kwangwamaje), Kongoma hill located at the eastern Pandogari. The distance from the state capital Minna to Pandogari is about 156.7km. Pandogari is headed by a district head called Hakimi in Hausa language, and the current Hakimi of Pandogari is Alhaji Idris Aliyu Jibril. There are three major languages in Pandogari town; they are Hausa, Fulani and Ɓurawa. 

In 2016, there was a religious conflict between Christians and Muslims in Pandogari which resulted in the death of four people, including a 24 year old young student.

Places near Pandogari
Places near Pandogari are:
Ringa
Gidan awane
Gidan buhari
Gidan damao
Gidan kurao
Gidan madawakin tugulbi
Gidan maigari boka
Gidan maikarfi
Gidan maizaji
Gidan sarkin uguru
Gidan sarkin Uran chiki
Gidan shabagu
Gidan tanko
Gidan tetige
Gidan ushiba
Gidan wusheynu

Distances from pandogari to other cities in Nigeria
 Pandogari - Minna   156.7km
 Pandogari - Lagos	  551km
 Pandogari - Abia	  565km
 Pandogari - Ogun	  470km
 Pandogari - Kano	  290km
 Pandogari - Ibadan	  435km
 Pandogari - Kaduna	  113km
 Pandogari - Port Harcourt	  627km
 Pandogari - Benin	  460km
 Pandogari - Maiduguri	  753km
 Pandogari - Zaria	  159km
 Pandogari - Aba	  597km
 Pandogari - Jos	  277 km
 Pandogari - Iorin	  294km
 Pandogari - Oyo	  393km
 Pandogari - Enugu	  457km
 Pandogari - Abeokuta	  494km
 Pandogari - Sokoto	  322km
 Pandogari - Onitsha	  473km
 Pandogari - Warri	  548km
 Pandogari - Oshogbo	  356km
 Pandogari - Okene	  318km
 Pandogari - Calabar  641km
 Pandogari - Katsina	  316km

Notable people in Pandogari
 Imam Habib Lawal (Chief Imam of Jama'atul Izalatul Bidi'a Wa'iƙamatus Sunnah, Pandogari)
 Alhaji Idris Aliyu (Head of Pandogari district)
 Alhaji Ado Tela (business man)
 Alhaji Aminu Wayo (business man)
 Alhaji Salisu mai wake (business man)
 Muhammad Bagobiri (Islamic Religion Instructor Tijaniyyah)
 Late Alhaji Aliyu Ahmad Bafillace Ringa (Islamic Religion Instructor and Fulani leader)
 Alhaji Abubakar Jibo Garba (Madakin Kagara Emirate)
 Late Alhaji Sama'ila Hayin Sarki (Farmer)
 Alhaji Zubairu Isma'il (politician)
 Mamman Dogo (politician)

Notable Areas within Pandogari
 Government Day Secondary School Pandogari
 Mamman Kwantagora Technical College Pandogari 
 Central Primary School Pandogari
 Kyareke Primary Health Care Pandogari

References

Towns in Nigeria